Jac-Cen-Del Junior-Senior High School is a public high school located in Osgood, Indiana.

Academics
Jac-Cen-Del Jr.-Sr. High School offers many  courses for students to take during such as Common Core classes. Jac-Cen-Del also offers courses such as engineering, art, band, computer science, anatomy, and sports training.

Athletics
Jac-Cen-Del Junior-Senior High School's athletic teams are the Eagles and they compete in the Ohio River Valley Conference. The school offers a wide range of athletics including:

Baseball
Basketball (men's and women's)
Cross country
Golf (men's and women's)
Soccer
Softball
Track and field
Volleyball

Soccer
The 2019 Boys' soccer team reached semi-state in the Class 1A State Championship. They lost against Indy Lutheran 1–0 at Seymour. Their record was 16-2-2. That's the best performance in this school.

Basketball
The 2015–16 Women's basketball team went 27–1 during the regular season and won the Class 1A State Championship (57–39) against Argos High School on February 27, 2016. Also, the Eagles for the boys won the 2009 Class 1A State Championship

Extracurricular activities
Jac-Cen-Del provides after school activities as the following:
Chess Club
Sports
Tutoring

The Indiana Academic Team also participates at Jac-Cen-Del, allowing students to join a variety of teams such as, English/language arts, math, science, social studies, and fine arts added on for the High School Division.

See also
 List of high schools in Indiana

References

External links
 Official Website
 Athletic's Twitter page

Buildings and structures in Ripley County, Indiana
Schools in Ripley County, Indiana